Dillwynia acicularis is a species of flowering plant in the family Fabaceae and is endemic to New South Wales. It is an erect shrub with linear, grooved leaves and yellow flowers with red markings.

Description

Taxonomy and naming
Dillwynia acicularis was first formally described in 1825 by Augustin Pyramus de Candolle in his Prodromus Systematis Naturalis Regni Vegetabilis. The specific epithet (acicularis) means "needle-pointed".

Distribution
This dillwynia grows in forest on sandstone or granite in the Sydney region, between the Goulburn River, Bargo and Braidwood in eastern New South Wales.

References

acicularis
Flora of New South Wales
Taxa named by Augustin Pyramus de Candolle
Plants described in 1825
Mirbelioids